Louis-Marie Ernest Daudet (31 May 1837 – 21 August 1921) was a French journalist, novelist and historian. Prolific in several genres, Daudet began his career writing for magazines and provincial newspapers all over France. His younger brother was Alphonse Daudet.

Biography
Ernest Daudet was born in Nîmes, an old Roman city of Languedoc, France. His father, Vincent Daudet, was a silk merchant whose lack of business sense eventually involved him in bankruptcy. His mother, Adeleine Reynaud, was descended from a respected Provençal family. In 1857 he went to Paris with his brother in order to gain a livelihood through literary pursuits. For a time he managed the Journaux Officiels and the Petit Moniteur. He was also the secretary-editor of the Legislative Corps and chief of the Cabinet of the Senate.

He died in Petites-Dalles in 1921, aged 84.

Publications

Fiction
 Thérèse (1859).
 Les Duperies de l’Amour (1865).
 Les Douze Danseuses du Château de Lamôle. Une Liaison Littéraire. John Stewart. Frédéric et Julie (1867).
 La Succession Chavanet (2 vols., 1867).
 Marthe Varadès (1868).
 La Succession Chavanet (1868).
 Le Missionnaire (1869).
 Le Prince Pogoutzine (1869).
 Les Soixante-et-Une Victimes de la Glacière (1869).
 Le Roman d'une Jeune Fille (1869).
 Jean-le-Gueux (1870).
 Les Dames de Ribeaurpix (1872).
 Fleur de Péché (1872).
 Le Roman de Delphine (1873).
 Un Mariage Tragique (1873).
 Les Aventures de Raymond Rocheray (1875).
 La Vénus de Gordes (1875, with Adolphe Belot).
 La Petite Sœur (1875).
 La Baronne Amalti (1877).
 Le Crime de Jean Malory (1877).
 Daniel de Kerfons, Confession d'un Homme du Monde (2 vols., 1877).
 La Marquise de Sardes (1878).
 Clarisse (1879).
 L'Aventure de Jeanne (1879).
 Dolorès (1879).
 Madame Robernier (1879).
 La Maison de Graville (1880).
 Le Fils de ces Dames (1880).
 Les Amoureux de Juliette (1880).
 Les Aventures des Trois Jeunes Parisiennes (1880).
 Robert Darnetal (1880).
 Le Mari (1880).
 Le Lendemain du Pêché (1881).
 Mon Frère et Moi (1882).
 La Caissière (1882).
 Défroqué (1882).
 Pervertis (1882).
 La Carmélite (1883).
 Le Père de Salviette (1883).
 Zahra Marsy (1883).
 Mademoiselle Vestris, Histoire d'une Orpheline (1883).
 Aventures de Femmes (1885).
 Les Reins Cassés (1885).
 Gisèle Rubens (1887).
 Fils d'Émigrés (1890).
 Le Gendarme Excommunié; Cruautés de Femmes; Madeleine Bonafous (1891).
 À l'Entrée de la Vie (1892).
 Mademoiselle de Circé, Roman d'une Conspiration sous le Premier Empire, 1805-1806 (1893).
 Aveux de Femme (1894).
 La Vénitienne (1894).
 Un Amour de Barras. Nuit de Noces. Aventure d'Émigré. Représailles. Une Nuit de Noël. Une Matinée de Fouché. Le Roman d'un Complot (1895).
 Drapeaux Ennemis (1895).
 Doux Raphaël (1895).
 Les Fiançailles Tragiques (1896).
 Pauline Fossin (1897).
 Rolande et Andrée (1897).
 La Mongautier, Roman des Temps Révolutionnaires (1897).
 Fléau qui Passe (1900).
 Nini-la-Fauvette (1903).
 Expiatrice (1904).
 L'Espionne (1905).
 Une Idylle dans un Drame (1905).
 Poste Restante (1908).
 La Course à l'Abîme (1909).
 Les Rivaux, Roman en Époques, 1795-1815-1830 (1910).
 Le Mauvais Arbre sera Coupé (1910).
 Beau-Casque, Roman des Temps Révolutionnaires (1910)

Non-fiction
 Le Cardinal Consalvi (1866).
 L'Agonie de la Commune, Paris à Feu et à Sang (1871).
 Trois Mois d'Histoire Contemporaine. La Vérité sur l'Essai de Restauration Monarchique. Événements qui se sont Accomplis du 5 août au 5 novembre 1873 (1873).
 Le Ministère Martignac (1875).
 Le Procès des Ministères (1875).
 Les Grands Épisodes de la Monarchie Constitutionnelle (1877).
 Henriette, Fragments du journal du marquis de Boisguerny (1877).
 La Terreur Blanche (1878).
 Souvenirs de la Présidence du Maréchal de Mac-Mahon (1881).
 Histoire des Conspirations Royalistes du Midi sous la Révolution (1790-1793) (1881).
 Histoire de la Restauration (1882).
 Histoire de l'Émigration: Les Bourbons et la Russie pendant la Révolution Française (1886).
 Histoire de l'Émigration: Les Émigrés et la Seconde Coalition, 1797-1800 (1886).
 Mémoires du Temps de Louis XIV (1889).
 La Police et les Chouans sous le Consulat et l’Empire, 1800-1815 (1895).
 Histoire Diplomatique de l'Alliance Franco-russe (1893).
 Les Coulisses de la Société Parisienne (2 vols., 1893).
 Le Duc d'Aumale, 1822-1897 (1898).
 Les Deux Évêques (1899).
 Louis XVIII et le duc Decazes, 1815-1820 (1899).
 La Conjuration de Pichegru et les Complots Royalistes du Midi et de l'Est, 1795-1797 (1901).
 Conspirateurs et Comédiennes, Épisodes d'Histoire d'Après des Documents Inédits, 1796-1825 (1902).
 Une Vie d'Ambassadrice au Siècle Dernier. La Princesse de Lieven (1903).
 Le Roman d'un Conventionnel. Hérault de Séchelles et les Dames de Bellegarde (1904).
 Histoire de l'Émigration pendant la Révolution Française (3 vols., 1904–1907).
 Au Temps de l'Empereur, Récits d'une Grand'mère (1907).
 Lettres du Cte Valentin Esterhazy à sa Femme (1907).
 Joseph de Maistre et Blacas, leur Correspondance Inédite et l'Histoire de leur Amitié, 1804-1820 (1908).
 L'Exil et la Mort du Général Moreau (1909).
 L'Ambassade du duc Decazes en Angleterre (1820-1821) (1910).
 À Travers Trois Siècles (1911).
 Les Complices des Auteurs de la Guerre. I. Ferdinand Ier, Tsar de Bulgarie (1912).
 La Chronique de nos Jours, Notes et Souvenirs pour Servir à l'Histoire (1912).
 Tragédies et Comédies de l'Histoire, Récits des Temps Révolutionnaires (1912).
 Madame Royale (1912).
 La Police Politique: Chronique des Temps de la Restauration (1912).
 Un Drame d'Amour à la Cour de Suède, 1784-1795 (1913).
 Vingt-cinq ans à Paris, 1826-1850. Journal du comte Rodolphe Apponyi (3 vols., 1913–1914).
 De la Terreur au Consulat, Récits Romanesques et Tragiques en Marge des Temps Révolutionnaires (1914).
 Journal de Victor de Balabine, Secrétaire de l'Ambassade de Russie: Paris de 1842 à 1852 (1914).
 Les Auteurs de la Guerre de 1914 (1916).
 La France et l'Allemagne après le Congrès de Berlin (2 vols., 1918–1919).
 Soixante Années du Règne des Romanov (1919)
 L'Avant-dernier Romanoff. Alexandre III (1920).
 Jeunes Filles d’Autrefois (1931).

Theater
 Marthe (1890).
 Un Drame Parisien (1892).
 La Citoyenne Cotillon (1904, with Henri Cain).

Miscellany
 Mon Frère et Moi, Souvenirs d'Enfance et de Jeunesse (1882).
 Mes Chroniques de 1915 et 1916, Pages d'Histoire en Marge de la Guerre (1917).
 Souvenirs de Mon Temps. I. Débuts d'un Homme de lettres. 1857-1861 (1921).

Works in English translation
 "Marshal de MacMahon," French Celebrities (1883).
 "Jules Simon," French Celebrities (1883).
 The Apostate (1893).
 "Du Barry's Adventure," The Parisian (1897).
 My Brother and I (1898).
 His Father's Wife (1908).
 Madame Royale, Daughter of Louis XVI and Marie Antoinette (1913).
 "France and Clemenceau," The Living Age (1917).

Notes

Further reading
 Bruyère, Marcel (1955). La Jeunesse D'Alphonse Daudet. Paris: Nouvelles Editions Latines.
 Giocanti, Stéphane (2013). C'Était les Daudet. Paris: Flammarion.
 James, Henry (1894). "Alphonse Daudet." In: Partial Portraits. London: Macmillan & Co., pp. 195–239.

External links

 
 
 Works by Ernest Daudet, at Hathi Trust
 Works by Ernest Daudet, at Gallica
 Works by Ernest Daudet, at Europeana
 Ernest Daudet, le Frère Oublié

1837 births
1921 deaths
People from Nîmes
Daudet family
19th-century French novelists
20th-century French novelists
19th-century French historians
French memoirists
French monarchists
Historians of the French Revolution
French male novelists
19th-century French male writers
20th-century French male writers
French male non-fiction writers
20th-century French historians